The 2001 AXA Liberty Bowl was a college football postseason bowl game played on December 31, 2001, at Liberty Bowl Memorial Stadium in Memphis, Tennessee. The 43rd edition of the Liberty Bowl featured the Louisville Cardinals and the BYU Cougars. 
The game was sponsored by the Axa Equitable Life Insurance Company and was branded as the AXA Liberty Bowl. Louisville won the game, 28–10.

References

Liberty Bowl
Louisville Cardinals football bowl games
BYU Cougars football bowl games
Liberty Bowl
Liberty Bowl